The Nagpur - Bhusawal S.F. Express is a tri weekly superfast mail/express train of Indian Railways, which runs between Nagpur railway station of Nagpur, the largest city and BhusawalMaharashtra.

This train is only direct connectivity for Harda and Khandwa from Amla Junction, Betul and Ghoradongri.

Arrival and departure
Train no.22111 departs from Bhusawal every Sunday, Wednesday and Friday at 05:35 hrs. from platform no.1 reaching Nagpur the same day at 16:00 hrs. at platform no. 1

Train no.22112 departs from Nagpur, every Monday, Thursday and Saturday at 07:20 hrs., reaching Bhusawal the same day at 17:45 hrs. at platform no. 3

Route and halts
The Train goes via Itarsi Junction and Khandwa. 
The Important Halt of This train are-
Nagpur
Katol
Narkher
Pandhurna
Multai
Amla Junction
Betul
Ghoradongri
Itarsi Junction
Harda
Khirkiya
Chhanera
Khandwa Junction
Nepanagar
Burhanpur
Bhusawal

Coach Composite
The train consists of 10 coaches 
Loco- SLR; GEN; GEN; GEN; GEN; GEN;C1; D1; D2; SLR (Nagpur To Itarsi)

Loco - SLR; D2; D1; C1; GEN; GEN; GEN; GEN; GEN; SLR (Itarsi to Bhusawal)
Unreserved - 5
Second Setting - 2
AC Chair Car - 1
 SLR - 2

The Train is hauled by BSL WAP/M-4

See also
Vindhyachal Express

Transport in Nagpur
Transport in Bhusawal
Express trains in India
Rail transport in Madhya Pradesh
Rail transport in Maharashtra
Railway services introduced in 2011